The Qatar Futsal League, is the top league for Futsal in Qatar. The league champions automatically qualify for the AFC Futsal Club Championship.

History
The league was founded in 2007.

Qatar Futsal League Member Clubs 
Table as of 2011-12 Season

Championship history

See also 
 AFC Futsal Club Championship

External links
QFA - Qatar Football Association - Futsal & Beach
Futsal Planet site

References

Futsal in Qatar
futsal
Qatar
Sports leagues established in 2007
2007 establishments in Qatar